Dabaihui Plaza is a supertall skyscraper located in Shenzhen, Guangdong, China. Construction began in 2012 and ended in 2021.

See also

List of tallest buildings in Shenzhen
List of tallest buildings in China
List of tallest buildings in the world

References

Skyscraper office buildings in Shenzhen
Buildings and structures under construction in China
Residential skyscrapers in China
Skyscrapers in Shenzhen